Vijoy 15 million people voted in the state of Bihar in the 1971 Indian general election, a turnout of 49%. The Indian National Congress won 39 seats from a total of 53.

National parties
BJS Bharatiya Jana Sangh
CPI Communist Party of India
CPM Communist Party of India (Marxist)
INC Indian National Congress
NCO Indian National Congress (Organisation)
PSP Praja Socialist Party
SSP Samyukta Socialist Party
SWA Swatantra Party

Statistics

Size of electorate: Bihar

List of successful candidates: Bihar
Bagaha (SC); Bhola Raut INC
Motihari;    Bibhuti Mishra INC
Bettiah;     Kamal Nath Tiwari INC
Gopalganj;   Dwarika Nath Tiwary INC
Siwan;       Mohamad Yusuf INC
Chapra;      Ram Shekhar Prasad Singh INC
Maharajganj; Ramdeo Singh SSP
Kesaria;     Kamla Mishra Madhukar CPI
Hajipur;     Digvijay Narain Singh NCO
Muzaffarpur; Nawal Kishore Sinha INC
≠Sitamarhi;; Nagendra Prasad Yadav INC
Pupri; Hari Kishore Singh INC
Jainagar; Bhogendra Jha CPI
Madhubani; Jagannath Mishra INC
Samastipur; Yamuna Prasad Mandal INC
Darbhanga; Vinoda Nand Jha INC
Rosera (SC); Ram Bhagat Paswan INC
Saharsa; Chiranjib Jha INC
Madhipura; Rajendra Prasad Yadav INC
Araria (SC); Tul Mohan Ram INC
Kishanganj; Jamilur Rahman INC
Purnea; Mohammad Tahir INC
Katihar; Gyaneshwar Prasad Yadav BJS
Rajmahal (St); Iswar Marandi INC
Godda Jagdish N#Mandal INC
Dumka (St); Satya Charan Besra INC
Banka; Shiv Chandika Prasad INC
Bhagalpur; Bhagwat Jha Azad INC
Monghyr; Deonandan Prasad Yadav INC
Jamui (SC); Bhola Manjhi CPI
Khagaria; Shivshankar Prasad Yadav SSP
Begusarai; Shyamnandan Mishra NCO
Nalanda; Sedheshwar Prasad INC
Barh; Dharamvir Singh INC
Patna; Ramavatar Shastri CPI
Shahabad; Bali Ram Bhagat INC
Buxar; Anant Prasad Sharma INC
Bikramganj; Sheo Pujan Singh INC
Sasaram (SC); Jag Jiwan Ram INC
Aurangabad; Satyendra Narayan Sinha NCO
Jehanabad; Chandra Shekhar Sinha CPI
Nawada; Sukhdeo Prasad Verma INC
Gaya (SC); Ishwar Choudhary BJS
Chatra; Shankar Dayal Singh INC
Giridih; Chapalendu Bhattacharyya INC
Dhanbad; Ram Narain Sharma INC
Hazaribagh; Damodar Pandey INC
Ranchi; Prashant Kumar Ghosh INC
Jamshedpur; Sardar Swaran Singh INC
Singhbhum (St); Moran Singh Purty Jkp
Khunti (St); Nirel Enem Horo Ind
Lohardaga (St); Kartik Oraon INC
Palamau (SC); Kamla Kumari INC

References

External links
 https://web.archive.org/web/20140718175452/http://eci.nic.in/eci_main/StatisticalReports/LS_1971/Vol_I_LS71.pdf

Bihar
Indian general elections in Bihar
1970s in Bihar